Laizāns is a surname. Notable people with the surname include:

Juris Laizāns (born 1979), Latvian footballer
Laimonis Laizāns (born 1945), Latvian footballer
Oļegs Laizāns (born 1987), Latvian footballer
Raimonds Laizāns (born 1964), Latvian footballer

Latvian-language masculine surnames